HMS Lawford (K514) was a Royal Navy converted Captain class frigate (pennant DE-516), built in the US in 1944. She was converted into an HQ ship for the Normandy landings. On 8 June 1944, whilst operating off Juno Beach, she was hit by enemy fire during an air attack and sunk. Thirty-seven of her crew died. The Royal Navy's damage summary reportstates that the ship was hit by an "aerial torpedo", which has been taken to mean a torpedo dropped from an aircraft. However, a survey of the ship undertaken as part of the Channel 4 TV series "Wreck Detectives" found evidence that the vessel was broken up and sunk by an internal explosion, indicating a hit from one or more bombs or from an early guided missile such as an Hs-293 or (less likely) a Fritz X.

Further consideration suggests that the term "aerial torpedo" used in the RN damage summaries was actually intended to refer to guided missiles.

See also
List of Captain class frigates
List of Allied warships in the Normandy landings
List of ships sunk by missiles

Notes

 

Captain-class frigates
Evarts-class destroyer escorts
Ships built in Boston
World War II frigates of the United Kingdom
Ships sunk by German aircraft
Maritime incidents in June 1944
Frigates sunk by aircraft
1943 ships